The National Trust of Australia (Victoria) is a community-based, non-government organisation committed to promoting and conserving Australia's indigenous, natural and historic heritage places of cultural significance in Victoria. It was founded in 1956.

Establishment
With threats to fine colonial mansions in Sydney, the first National Trust in Australia was established in New South Wales in 1945. In Victoria, where the heritage of ornate land boom buildings was less valued, it took some time for heritage advocates to get organised. The publication in 1953 of the popular Early Melbourne Architecture 1840-1888, by artist, writer, and public speaker Maie Casey was the first attempt at raising awareness.

In the following months, major figures from society, the arts, town planning and architecture in Melbourne began to discuss the setting up of Trust similar to that in Britain and NSW. Spurred by the demolition of the spectacular 1870 mansion Wendrew in Toorak in 1954, and the likely imminent sale of the nearby grand colonial estate Como House, a series of ever larger meetings were held, culminating in the formation of the National Trust of Australia (Victoria) in May 1956, as a charity, with its first aim being the acquisition of Como. A remarkable feature of the people who established the Trust was the number of prominent and influential people, and "the close network of family and business between them". These figures included author Joan, her husband Daryl Lindsay, Director of the National Gallery of Victoria, R T M Pescott, director of the Museum of Victoria, architect and critic Robin Boyd, Maie Casey and her husband politician Richard Casey, Noel and Elizabeth Goss, architect Roy Simpson, and University of Melbourne Professor of Architecture Brian Lewis. Early Patrons included Sir Dallas Brooks and Lady Brooks, Sir Owen Dixon, Lord Baillieu, Lady Grimwade and Lady Murdoch.

Properties
The Victorian National Trust manages 38 properties in the state, 30 of which it owns, and eight of which are properties on Crown land. There are 24 National Trust properties regularly open to the public. 
The most well known include the historic cell block known as the Old Melbourne Gaol in Melbourne, the Melbourne Maritime Museum in Southbank which includes the restored ship the Polly Woodside, and the historic mansion and gardens of the Rippon Lea Estate in Elsternwick and Como House in Toorak.

See also
List of National Trust properties in Australia
List of Australian Living Treasures
SAHANZ, the Society of Architectural Historians, Australia and New Zealand

References

External links
 National Trust of Australia (Victoria)

Further reading 
 Mary Rhyllis Clark, In Trust (1996), recollections of the Victorian Trust pioneers

 
Historical societies of Australia
1956 establishments in Australia
Organizations established in 1956
Tourism in Victoria (Australia)
Organisations based in Victoria (Australia)